Philip Graham Rogerson (1 January 1945 – 19 May 2022) was a British businessman who served as the chairman of Bunzl and De La Rue.

Early life
Philip Graham Rogerson was born on 1 January 1945 to Henry and Florence Rogerson. He was a chartered accountant.

Career
Rogerson was chairman of Carillion from May 2005 to May 2014. He served as chairman of Bunzl from March 2010, and chairman of De La Rue from July 2012.

Personal life and death
Rogerson lived in the UK. He died on 19 May 2022, at the age of 77.

References

1945 births
2022 deaths
British businesspeople
Bunzl people
Carillion people